= Henry of Anjou =

Henry of Anjou may refer to:

- Henry II of England, Count of Anjou from 1133 to his death in 1189
- Henry III of France, Duke of Anjou from 1551 to his death in 1589
